Bukola Elemide (born 17 September 1982), professionally known as Aṣa, is a Nigerian-French singer, songwriter, and recording artist.

Early life
Aṣa was born in Paris to Nigerian parents who were working and studying cinematography in France. Her family returned to live in Nigeria when she was two years old. Her parents hail from Itoku, Abeokuta South local government area, Ogun State, Nigeria. Aṣa grew up in Lagos city, in the south-western part of Nigeria, and 18 years later, returned to Paris, where her life as an artist took off. She has three older brothers.

Asa's music influences grew over the years from the collection of great music her father had built up for his work as a cinematographer. These records featuring American, Nigerian and African soul classics, included artists such as Marvin Gaye, Fela Kuti, Bob Marley, Aretha Franklin, King Sunny Adé, Diana Ross, Nina Simone, and Miriam Makeba. Aṣa drew inspiration from the collection of her father's playlist.

Career
In 2004, Asa met her manager and friend, Janet Nwose, who introduced her to Cobhams Asuquo, who in turn became the producer of her first studio album Asa (Asha).

Aṣa returned to France at the age of 20 to study at the IMFP school of jazz music, where she was told by teachers that she should go ahead and become a recording artist because she was ready and needed no schooling. Back in Nigeria, her first single, "Eyé Adaba," was beginning to get airplay. Aṣa soon signed to Naïve Records. Partnered with Asuquo, and with the new involvement of Christophe Dupouy and Benjamin Constant, she produced her first platinum-selling self-titled album, Aṣa. The release of the album saw Aṣa charting radios across Europe, Asia, and Africa and went on to win the prestigious French Constantin Award in 2008 when she was voted the best fresh talent of 10 singers or groups by a jury of 19 music-industry specialists in Paris.

Her second album, Beautiful Imperfection, in collaboration with French composer Nicolas Mollard, was released on 25 October 2010, went platinum in 2011. The lead single from Beautiful Imperfection, titled "Be My Man", was released in late September 2010. It was reported that by 2014 Aṣa sold 400,000 albums worldwide.

Asa's third studio album, Bed of Stone, was released in August 2014. The singles are "Dead Again", "Eyo", "Satan Be Gone", "The One That Never Comes" and "Moving On". She went on a world tour from 2015 to 2017.

On 14 May 2019, she released a new single titled "The Beginning" and on 25 June 2019, she released the single "Good Thing". On 11 September 2019, she announced on her Twitter page that her new album, Lucid, will be released on 11 October 2019, which it was. She released yet another album on the 25th of February 2022 titled "V" featuring the likes of Wizkid, Nigerian highlife duo The Cavemen and Ghanaian artist Amaarae.

She is one of Nigeria's most exposed musicians with an estimated net worth of $28 million.

Discography

Studio albums

Live albums
 Live in Paris (2009)
 Live in Lagos (2017)

Singles

Soundtrack appearances
2007: "Kokoya" - on the soundtrack to the film The First Cry
2009: "The Place To Be" - soundtrack for GTBank 
2011: "Zarafa" - soundtrack for the animation movie Zarafa

Awards and nominations

2008: Prix Constantin
2011: French Music Awards Victoires de la Musique nomination for "Female Artist of the Year".

See also
List of Nigerian musicians

References

External links
 Official website.

1982 births
Living people
21st-century French singers
English-language singers from France
Nigerian women singer-songwriters
French people of Nigerian descent
French people of Yoruba descent
French singer-songwriters
Musicians from Paris
Nigerian singer-songwriters
Nigerian soul musicians
The Headies winners
Yoruba-language singers
Yoruba women musicians
21st-century French women singers
21st-century Nigerian singers
Naïve Records artists